Marek Motyka (born 17 April 1958 in Żywiec) is a Polish football manager and former footballer, currently in charge of LKS Śledziejowice.

Player career

Club
Marek Motyka began his career with two hometown clubs: Sole and Koszarawa Żywiec. Later he played for Hutnik Kraków, and in the beginning of 1978 moved to Wisła Kraków. In 1990, he played for the Norwegian club SK Brann. He eventually returned to Poland to play for Hetman Zamość, Cracovia, Kalwarianka Kalwaria Zebrzydowska and Garbarz Zembrzyce. Motyka played in 224 matches and scored 6 goals in the Polish 1st Division.

National team
In addition, he represented Poland on 8 different occasions.

Coaching career
Motyka began his coaching career at Szczakowianka Jaworzno which he managed from 21 May 2002, to 22 May 2003. He managed Tłoki Gorzyce after his time in Jaworzno. On 1 July 2004 Polonia Warsaw hired Motyka with the goal of avoiding degradation. On 15 July 2005 he was replaced by Dariusz Kubicki. On 4 November 2005 he joined Górnik Zabrze and managed to save the team from degradation to the Polish Second Division. Between January and April 2006 he was temporarily replaced by Ryszard Komornicki, but replaced soon after. On 12 December 2006, he was released by Górnik. Zdzisław Podedworny soon took the position at Gornik Zabrze. He was hired once again in March 2007, after the 2nd round of the spring 2007 season by Gornik Zabrze. On 9 July 2008 Motyka was appointed as manager of Polonia Bytom. In 2009, he joined Korona Kielce.

References

1958 births
Living people
Polish football managers
Polish expatriate footballers
Polish footballers
Poland international footballers
Eliteserien players
SK Brann players
Wisła Kraków players
Hutnik Nowa Huta players
Expatriate footballers in Norway
Górnik Zabrze managers
Korona Kielce managers
Polonia Warsaw managers
Kolejarz Stróże managers
Polonia Bytom managers
People from Żywiec
Sportspeople from Silesian Voivodeship
Association football defenders